Olga Vasilyevna Shishigina (born 23 December 1968 in Almaty) is a retired Kazakhstani track and field athlete who mainly competed in the 100 metres hurdles. Honoured Master of Sports and the pride of Kazakhstan, which has won many medals in various competitions. She won an Olympic gold medal in 2000, and many medals on the regional and continental level. She is the only gold medalist in both the Championship and the Olympic Games in Athletics. Olga's first victory was at the Asian Games, which was held in Hiroshima in 1994. Shishigina was banned between 1996 and 1998 for failing a drug test. She holds the rank of Major in the Border Guard Service of Kazakhstan.

Biography 
 
At an early age, her parents sent their girl to the athletics section. She really enjoyed this type of sport, was fond of different running types and began to train hard every day. With the help of diligent training, she quickly entered the international level, where she competed with opponents from different countries. She is the only gold medalist in both the Championship and the Olympic Games in Athletics. Since then, she has won 8 first places, 2 silver and two thirds. She set an Asian record in the 100m hurdles, covering the distance in 12.4 seconds. All her awards and orders are kept in a modest corner of the house. Olga Shishigina's sports career began with a victory at the 1994 Asian Games in Hiroshima, she also won silver medals at the 1995 Summer (Gothenburg) and Winter (Barcelona) World Championships; followed by gold at the 1999 World Indoor Championships (Maebashi, Japan) and an Olympic triumph in 2000 in Sydney. Shishigina Olga Vasilievna was born on December 23, 1968, in the city of Almaty. Despite the fact that she was loaded with training and competitions, she received higher education at the Kazakh State Academy of Tourism and Sports in 2002. Athlete, 2000 Sydney Olympic champion and indoor world champion in the 100m hurdles. In 2000, at the 27th Summer Olympics in Sydney, on the 13th day of the competition, she first fell behind, then caught up and finished first. She noticed that her mistake was that she stuck too long at the start. However, most of the opponents quickly run through the first half and suffocate at the end. Olga, on the contrary, began to run better only in the second half. In an interview, she noted that she felt pride in patriotism and the enthusiastic echoes of her compatriots from the podium during the competition, and this gave her more motivation to win. Olga always says that she never gets bored of photos with fans and that she does not suffer from star fever like many winners. However, her husband doesn't like when fans try to hug and kiss her.
 
At an early age, Olga's mom noticed how her daughter was fond of running. As a child, Olga behaved like a tomboy, played only with boys and always dressed like a boy, as the dresses didn't catch on to her. At the age of 7, a coach noticed her passion for sports and began to turn her into a future champion. Since childhood, she has been keen on simple and obstacle courses. When Olga was 10 she got into the Olympic reserve and at 19 when she entered the national team of the Union, she unexpectedly got married. Olga managed to taste the flavour of marriage life and give birth to a son. In the late 80s, the girl began to experience a recession in physical terms, which is why she temporarily left the performances and focused on gaining the optimal form. Since childhood, she was famous among boys and went on dates a lot. But accepted only Dmitry who is now her husband. For almost a month she received flowers from him anonymously (until she knew who the sender was), then he got her heart. If she is the most daring woman at competitions, then at home she is very homely and hospitable. Her motto for life: "Family comes first, sport comes second." With her husband, she raised a son, who, in turn, is also interested in sports, but does not plan to do this on a professional level. Just like most women she often mentions how much she enjoys spending time with her family. In almost all interviews she does not get tired of claiming that her victories are the merit of her husband - Dmitry Gridnev, since because of the competition, she dumped all household life on his shoulders, and withstood fatherhood in her opinion with dignity (took care of her son and home in her absence);
 
She managed to achieve success in the 90s. In 1993 she took bronze at the Asian Championships, and a few months later she took gold. Since then, she has won eight first places, 2 silver and two thirds. Her last performance was at a tournament in Edmonton, after which she retired due to earned injuries. Except for sports she likes to cook in her spare time and this is her hobby since the age of 15. She mainly likes to cook various dishes where there are a lot of apples, such as apple pie, buns, cakes etc. The main characters which helped her to become a champion are her braveness, persistence and leadership skills. The coach said about her that she always went to victory with the tenacity of a small tank (in a loving way). The Germans noted that she had diamond technique since she jumped so clearly. After her career as an athlete was completed, she wanted to return to the sports as a coach and realized that it was necessary to teach future champions in athletics from childhood. However, the wind of change blew from Astana and in 2016 she became a deputy of the Mazhilis of the Parliament of the Republic of Kazakhstan of the sixth convocation, a member of the People's Democratic Party "Nur Otan" according to the party-list election. She also mentioned that some of her future dreams are to help veterans and future champions, raise Olympic pensions and build schools for aspiring athletes. Due to her retirement from sports, she was confused and didn't know where to work or how to continue a normal life. She tried to realize herself in something else. She tried herself at an apartment works, built a house at her grandmother's country house.

Achievements

Reward 

 1994—master of sports of international class;
 1999 — Order "Kurmet";
 1999 — Honored Master of Sports of the Republic of Kazakhstan in athletics.
 2000 (12th December) — Order "Barys" I degree; 
 2000 (27th December) — State Youth Prize "Daryn";
 2005 (12th December) — Order "Dostyk" 2nd degree;

Government medals:

 Medal “20 years of the Constitution of the Republic of Kazakhstan” (2015);
 Medal “25 years of the independence of the Republic of Kazakhstan” (2016);
 Medal “20 years of Astana” (2018);
 Medal “25 years of the Constitution of the Republic of Kazakhstan” (2020);

Personal bests

Social activity 
Visiting Kazakh Ablai Khan University of International Relations and World Languages. 

1987 - 1992 - service in the Armed Forces of the Republic of Kazakhstan. - Service in the Armed Forces of the Republic of Kazakhstan

1994 - 2013 - Service in the National Security Committee of the Republic of Kazakhstan.

From January 22, 2013, to January 20, 2016 - deputy of the Majilis of the Parliament of the Republic of Kazakhstan of the fifth convocation, member of the People's Democratic      Party "Nur Otan", elected according to the party list.

Since March 25, 2016 - deputy of the Majilis of the Parliament of the Republic of Kazakhstan of the sixth convocation, a member of the People's Democratic Party "Nur Otan", elected according to the party list.

Work in Commissions (VI convocation -2016)

1.Member of the supervisory board at Kazakh State Women Pedagogical University (Almaty).

2. Member of the ANC deputy group in the Majilis of the Parliament of the Republic of Kazakhstan.

3. A member of the commission on control of targeted and efficient spending of budgetary funds and funds allocated from the National Fund of the Republic of Kazakhstan for implementation of the State Infrastructure Development Programme "Nurly Zhol" for 2015–2019 in the direction of "Development of Social Infrastructure".

4. Member of the cooperation group with the following states: Qatar, Malaysia, Republic of Cuba, Republic of Poland, Ukraine (Group 1);
Kingdom of Morocco, Hungary, New Zealand, Republic of Serbia, Slovak Republic, Russian Federation (Group 12);
Kingdom of Denmark, Republic of Iraq, Socialist Republic of Viet Nam, Mexico, Republic of South Africa (Group of 15).

5. Member of the Standing Commission on Culture, Information, Tourism and Sport of the Inter-Parliamentary Assembly of the Commonwealth of Independent States (IPA CIS)

Speaking: 
1.At the Second Eurasian Women's Form (19-21 September 2018).
 - Topic: "On the modernisation of social consciousness in Kazakhstan";
 - topic: "Women in Culture: Traditions and Innovations". (dialogue platform).
2.At the meeting of the Commission on "Youth Support" on the implementation of the Third Presidential Initiative on the theme: "Improving the accessibility and quality of higher education and improving the living conditions of student youth".  (September 27, 2018 at the Nur Otan CA).

References

External links

1968 births
Living people
Sportspeople from Almaty
Kazakhstani female hurdlers
Olympic athletes of Kazakhstan
Olympic gold medalists for Kazakhstan
Athletes (track and field) at the 2000 Summer Olympics
Asian Games medalists in athletics (track and field)
Athletes (track and field) at the 1994 Asian Games
Athletes (track and field) at the 1998 Asian Games
World Athletics Championships athletes for Kazakhstan
World Athletics Championships medalists
Doping cases in athletics
Kazakhstani sportspeople in doping cases
Medalists at the 2000 Summer Olympics
Asian Games gold medalists for Kazakhstan
Olympic gold medalists in athletics (track and field)
Medalists at the 1994 Asian Games
Medalists at the 1998 Asian Games
World Athletics Indoor Championships winners